Kyle Wanvig (born January 29, 1981) is a Canadian former professional ice hockey Right winger who played in the National Hockey League with the Minnesota Wild and the Tampa Bay Lightning.

Playing career 
Wanvig was originally drafted 89th overall by the Boston Bruins in the 1999 NHL Entry Draft, but he re-entered the draft and was selected 36th overall by the Minnesota Wild in the 2001 NHL Entry Draft. While with the Wild affiliate, the Houston Aeros of the American Hockey League, in 2002-2003, Kyle Wanvig scored three game winning goals in the first series of the playoffs, against the Milwaukee Admirals, which led to a Calder Cup Championship.

In July 2006, he was signed by the Atlanta Thrashers. In February 2007, he was traded to the Tampa Bay Lightning along with Stephen Baby for Andy Delmore and Andre Deveaux.

He came to the Swedish Elitserien to play for Brynäs IF in November 2008. However, in January 2009 Wanvig's contract with Brynäs IF was terminated with immediate effect.

In 2009, Wanvig returned to North America, joining the Portland Pirates of the AHL.

In July 2010 he signed a contract with the Augsburger Panther, 2010 finalists of the highest German league, the DEL.

During the 2011–12 season, while contracted to EC VSV, Wanvig announced his retirement after 16 games when he suffered an injury on December 11, 2011.

Career statistics

Regular season and playoffs

International

Awards and honors

References

External links
 

1981 births
Living people
Amur Khabarovsk players
Augsburger Panther players
Boston Bruins draft picks
Brynäs IF players
Canadian ice hockey forwards
Chicago Wolves players
EC VSV players
Edmonton Ice players
Houston Aeros (1994–2013) players
HK Poprad players
Ice hockey people from Calgary
Kootenay Ice players
Minnesota Wild draft picks
Minnesota Wild players
Portland Pirates players
Red Deer Rebels players
Springfield Falcons players
Tampa Bay Lightning players
Canadian expatriate ice hockey players in Austria
Canadian expatriate ice hockey players in Slovakia
Canadian expatriate ice hockey players in Germany
Canadian expatriate ice hockey players in Russia
Canadian expatriate ice hockey players in Sweden
Canadian expatriate ice hockey players in the United States